Parag Kishorchandra Shah is an Indian real estate developer and politician belonging to the Bharatiya Janata Party. In 2019, he was elected as Member of Maharashtra Legislative Assembly representing Ghatkopar East constituency.

Political career 
In 2017, Shah contested Brihanmumbai Mahanagar Palika (BMC) election from ward 132 and won from there later. He declared movable assets worth  and immovable assets worth  on his and his wife's name. He was the richest contesting candidate in the election.

Shah contested in 2019 Maharashtra Legislative Assembly election from Ghatkopar East constituency. At this time, he declared his property worth  and he was richest candidate in the election. He won the election with margin of 53319 votes.

References

Living people
1969 births
Politicians from Mumbai
Bharatiya Janata Party politicians from Maharashtra
Maharashtra MLAs 2019–2024
Gujaratis from Mumbai